The United Reformed Churches in North America (URCNA) is a theologically conservative federation of Reformed churches founded in 1996. Many churches joined the URCNA after splitting from the Christian Reformed Church in North America denomination.

Origin 
The URCNA has grown from the earlier Protestant movements in Europe of the 16th and 17th century, and also from Reformed churches in Belgium and the Netherlands. Like other churches in the Reformed tradition, it traces its interpretation of Scripture back to the sixteenth-century Reformer, John Calvin. Although Calvinism took root in many countries in Europe, it took especial hold in the Netherlands. Dutch immigrants to North America carried their beliefs with them over the subsequent centuries. Rather than joining existing churches of other denominations in North America, these Dutch immigrants started their own churches, churches that became known as the Christian Reformed Church in North America. Over the twentieth century, the Christian Reformed Church grew progressively more liberal, although not all members were pleased by this new direction. Conservative reformed believers were generally concerned that the Christian Reformed Churches were departing from Scriptural teaching to accommodate modern social trends. Specific disagreements arose on issues like women's ordination, evolution cases, and biblical inerrancy.

In 1996, the URCNA was founded as a federation of Reformed churches in 1996 at Lynwood, Illinois CRC. Most of the members that founded the URCNA left the Christian Reformed Church, although members of other Reformed denominations quickly joined the new federation. Some 36 churches with 7,600 members joined the federative unity, held their first Synod, and adopted the name United Reformed Churches in North America.

Beliefs 
The URCNA subscribes to three confessions of faith: the Canons of Dordt, written in 1618 and 1619 by an international group of Reformed churches, the Belgic Confession, written by Guido de Bres in the mid-1500s, and the Heidelberg Catechism, formally attributed to Zacharias Ursinus and Caspar Olevianus in the city of Heidelberg, Germany. Collectively, these statements of faith are called the "Three Forms of Unity." In addition to these forms, the URCNA holds to the three ecumenical creeds: the Apostles Creed, the Nicene Creed, and the Athanasian Creed. 

One of the distinct fundamental doctrines the URCNA describes is forensic justification or the glorious exchange of salvation, according to which Christ offers a double benefit: one's sin is imputed to Christ and he suffers for it on the cross, while His perfect obedience is credited to believers who receive its benefits, including eternal life. Like many other theologically conservative traditions, the URCNA strongly holds to the inerrancy of Scripture. 

The URCNA believe that "marriage is designed to be a lifelong, monogamous covenantal union between one man and one woman."

Practices 
The practices of the URCNA are governed by a church order derived from the Synod of Dordt of 1618-1619. The URCNA church order outlines the duties of the three ecclesiastical offices of ministers, elders, and deacons within the denomination. 

It also sets out the denomination's decentralized presbyteral form of church government as opposed to the hierarchical form of government found within the Anglican Church or Catholic Church. Each congregation is governed by a consistory made up of the elders elected from the congregation and the minister of the congregation. Periodically, delegates from each consistory will attend a regional classis or a denomination-wide synod to discuss matters pertaining to the entire denomination. Both classes and synods are temporary bodies with no formal authority. Although they may provide advice on matters to local consistories that carry great weight, the final authority rests with the consistories of each local congregation.

The church articulates the many practices of the URCNA churches. URCNA churches hold two services every Sunday with the expectation that members attend both services. The morning service typically focuses on preaching based on a particular passage in the Bible, while the afternoon or evening service normally is dedicated to being an explanation of one of the doctrines articulated the Three Forms of Unity. Both psalms and hymns may be sung during the worship service, although the psalms occupy the principal place of singing during the services. The URCNA practices infant baptism and requires a public profession of faith once members are spiritually mature (usually between the ages of 16-19). After members make this public profession of faith, they may partake of the Lord's Supper and are eligible to vote within the church. 

The URCNA church order also outlines the process of church discipline.

Statistics 
URCNA churches can be found in 22 US states, mostly in the Upper Midwest (Iowa and Michigan) and California, and in six Canadian Provinces, mostly in Ontario, Alberta, and British Columbia. As of 2018, the churches have grown, mostly through additional members leaving the CRCNA in the late 1990s, to approximately 123 congregations spread across the United States and Canada, with 24,617 members, 183 ministers, and 8 Classes (Michigan, Central US, Eastern US, Southwest US, Pacific Northwest, Ontario East, Southwestern Ontario, Western Canada).

Missions 

The URCNA supports many missions in the US and around the world. Mission churches can be found in Ecuador, Costa Rica, the Philippines, Mexico, and other third world countries. Individual members and individual churches may support missions through parachurch mission organizations such as Word and Deed although the denomination also has its own URCNA Missions coordinator. The URCNA monthly missions newsletters is called The Trumpet.

Training of ministers 
The United Reformed Churches do not have a denominational seminary or college; rather, Candidates for Ministry are extensively examined by their Calling Church and Classis regardless of seminary prior to their ordination or installation. Most of the ministers of the URCNA have been trained at Calvin Theological Seminary (Grand Rapids, Michigan), Mid-America Reformed Seminary (Dyer, Indiana), or Westminster Seminary in California (Escondido, California) but the number of other seminaries represented is growing.

Mergers 
The Orthodox Christian Reformed Churches, another breakaway from the Christian Reformed Church, voted to join the URCNA in 2008 upon the latter's invitation.

Interchurch relationships 
The URCNA is in full ecumenical fellowship with the Canadian and American Reformed Churches, Orthodox Presbyterian Church, Reformed Church in the United States, Reformed Church of Quebec and Reformed Presbyterian Church of North America.

The URCNA also has dialogue with the Reformed Churches of New Zealand, Korean American Presbyterian Church, Presbyterian Church in America and other confessional Reformed churches. It is a member of the International Conference of Reformed Churches and the North American Presbyterian and Reformed Council.

References

External links
 
 Learn more about the Reformed faith

Reformed denominations in the United States
Christian organizations established in 1996
Calvinist denominations established in the 20th century
Reformed denominations in Canada